Phidippus johnsoni, the red-backed jumping spider, is one of the largest and most commonly encountered jumping spiders of western North America. It is not to be confused with the unrelated and highly venomous redback spider (Latrodectus hasselti).

Description
Adults tend to be about a centimeter in length. Both sexes have a bright red abdomen; the female has an additional black central stripe. The chelicerae of both sexes are of a shining teal color. The rest of the body is mostly black. It is one of the species of jumping spiders that are mimics of mutillid wasps in the genus Dasymutilla (commonly known as "velvet ants"); several species of these wasps are similar in size and coloration, and possess a very painful sting.

Distribution
The distribution of P. johnsoni is bounded by the Great Plains, the Pacific Ocean, northern Mexico, and southern Canada. It occurs from sea level to tree line, occupying relatively dry habitats such as coastal dunes or oak woodlands. Between two and thirty redback jumping spiders per 1,000 m2 were found during a study in 1976.

In 2012, NASA sent an individual of this species into space.

Habits
This species constructs conspicuous tubular silken nests under rocks and wood on the ground and sometimes grape vines. They remain inside these at night and during bad weather. Molting, egg laying and sometimes courtship and mating occur inside these nests. Although found to feed on a wide variety of insects (e.g., flies, bugs and moth caterpillars and adults), they also prey heavily on spiders. Cannibalism does occur from time to time, in the form of females feeding on males.

References

Peckham, G. W. & E. G. Peckham (1883). Descriptions of new or little known spiders of the family Attidae from various parts of the United States of North America. Milwaukee, pp. 1–35.
Jackson, R.R. (1977). Prey of the jumping spider Phidippus johnsoni (Araneae: Salticidae). J. Arachnol. 5:145-149. PDF
Jackson, R.R. (1978). The life history of Phidippus johnsoni (Araneae: Salticidae). J. Arachnol. 6:1-29. PDF

External links

Pictures and description (with pictures of mating dance)

Spiders described in 1883
Salticidae
Spiders of North America